Birnbaum may refer to:

Places
 Birnbaum an der Warthe, now Międzychód, Greater Poland Voivodeship, Poland 
 Kreis Birnbaum, an administrative district of the Grand Duchy of Posen and, later, the Prussian province of Posen
 Birnbaum (Frankenwald), an unincorporated area in Kronach, Bavaria, Germany
 Birnbaum (Gummersbach), a district of Gummersbach, North Rhine-Westphalia, Germany
 Birnbaum (Lesachtal), a village in Lesachtal, Carinthia, Austria
 Hrušica (plateau), in Slovenia

Other uses
Birnbaum (painting), by Gustav Klimt
Birnbaum (surname)

See also
Barenboim (surname)
Bernbaum
Berenbaum